The men's pole vault event at the 2019 European Athletics Indoor Championships was held on 1 March at 19:06 (qualification) and 2 March at 18:10 (final) local time.

Medalists

Records

Results

Qualification

Qualification: Qualifying performance 5.80 (Q) or at least 8 best performers (q) advance to the final.

Final

References

2019 European Athletics Indoor Championships
Pole vault at the European Athletics Indoor Championships